The SNCF Class BB 30000 electric locomotives were built by Fives-Lille, CEM and MTE in 1961.  They were the tri-current version of BB 9400 "Vespa" locomotives, of which they were closely derived, and inherited much of the knowledge of the experiences of BB 20004.

History 
Unfortunately, the technology to develop such kinds of locomotives wasn't advanced enough at that time. Therefore, the engineers stuck to the idea of realizing a reliable series of dual-voltage locomotive first.

But, with the electrification of the Paris-Brussels line pending, the engineers wanted to modify the locomotives so that they also could operate of the Belgian 3 kV DC.  As the locomotive had still primitive DC motors, this could be done by connecting them together in series or series-parallel.

In 1961 the 2 locomotives were delivered as BB 26001 and BB 26002 and closely resembled to their DC counterparts BB 9400, but had also some differences: they had already double lights (one couple for white, one couple for red) instead of a single couple on BB 9400/BB 16000 series and their pantographs were inverted.

Career 
BB 26002 pulled the very first commercial train on the fully electrified Paris-Brussels line on 9 September 1963.  For the first 4 years the locomotives operated in pool with the Belgian HLE 15 locomotives but after the arrival of the stronger CC 40100 series, they pulled the lighter trains between Paris and Belgium due to their low power.  They were also renumbered in BB 30001 and BB 30002 in 1963. BB 30002 was retired in 1970 after it was damaged by a fire, BB 30001 followed in 1974.

References 
 

30000
B-B locomotives
Standard gauge electric locomotives of France
Railway locomotives introduced in 1961
Multi-system locomotives

Passenger locomotives